Retroville may refer to:
 Retroville, a fictional city and setting of The Adventures of Jimmy Neutron, Boy Genius
 Retroville, the shopping mall destroyed in the Kyiv shopping centre bombing